Savo Jovanović (born 11 November 1999) is a Serbian footballer, who plays for Sloboda Užice.

Club career

Sloboda Užice
As a product of Sloboda Užice youth academy, Jovanović has joined the first team in 2017. After he spent the 18 fixture match against Zemun as an unused substitution, Jovanović made his senior debut for the team in the last round of the 2016–17 Serbian First League season, replacing Aleksandar Mitrović in 76 minute of the match against Bežanija, played on 27 May 2017.

Career statistics

Club

References

1999 births
Living people
Sportspeople from Užice
Association football midfielders
FK Sloboda Užice players
Serbian First League players
Serbian footballers